Anna Maria Nobili (born 1949) is an Italian physicist active in the field of gravitational physics. Her institution is Pisa University. She authored a number of papers on satellite dynamics and co-authored a book with Andrea Milani and Paolo Farinella on the orbital perturbations induced by non-gravitational forces. After having published several papers on celestial mechanics, also in collaboration with Clifford Will and E. Myles Standish, Nobili is now Principal Investigator of the Galileo Galilei (GG) experiment aimed to improve the accuracy of the equivalence principle lying at the foundation of general relativity and of other metric theories of gravity. Asteroid 552746 Annanobili, discovered by Yuri Ivascenko at the Andrushivka Astronomical Observatory in 2010, was named in her honor. The official  was published by IAU's WGSBN on 20 September 2021.

Bibliometric information 
As of November 2013, according to the NASA ADS database, the h-index of A.M. Nobili is 17, with a total number of citations (self-citations excluded) equal to about 1000. Her tori index and riq index are 19.2 and 118, respectively.

References

External links 
 A.M. Nobili homepage
 A.M. Nobili list of publications
 Galileo Galilei (GG) project
 Galileo Galilei on the Ground (GGG) project
 GG Phase A-2 Study Report April 2009

21st-century Italian women scientists
21st-century Italian physicists
Italian women physicists
Living people
1949 births